The Capture of Mannheim was undertaken on 2 November 1622 by the Imperial-Spanish army commanded by Johan Tzerclaes, Count of Tilly against the Protestant troops under the Englishman Sir Horace Vere during the Thirty Years' War.

Background
In September 1620, the Imperial-Spanish troops led by the Count of Tilly and Don Gonzalo Fernández de Córdoba invaded and conquered the Lower Palatinate. The Protestant garrison under Sir Horace Vere held Frankenthal, Mannheim, and Heidelberg, but the rest of the Palatinate fell into Spanish hands.

On 19 September 1622 the Imperial-Spanish army defeated the Protestant troops under Sir Gerard Herbert at Heidelberg and the Catholic army went on to conquer the town.

Siege of Mannheim
The Spanish continued their progress towards Mannheim. The city was defended by the Anglo-German-Protestants troops commanded by Horace Vere. The Count of Tilly subjected Manheim to a siege, and the Imperial-Spanish forces swiftly defeated the Protestant troops. The city was conquered by the Spaniards, and Vere, and a few hundred of his men, retired to the citadel. Finally, and without hope of reinforcements, Vere was forced to capitulate. Just Frankenthal remained under control of the Protestants commanded by Sir John Burroughs, but was taken one year later by the Spanish troops under Don Guillermo Verdugo.

Aftermath

The courage displayed by Horace Vere against great odds was recognised in England, when the General returned early in February 1623, even if his salary and expenses were never paid in full by the treasury. On 16 February 1623 he was appointed Master-General of the Ordnance for life, and he became a member of the Council of War on 20 July 1624.

In 1624, Vere travelled once more to The Hague in order to second Prince Maurice of Orange in the defence of the important fortress of Breda, under siege by the Spaniards under Don Ambrosio Spinola from August.

See also
Electorate of Palatinate
Thirty Years' War
Palatinate campaign

Notes

References
 Rudolf Schäfer: Höchst am Main. Frankfurt am Main 1981: Frankfurter Sparkasse 1822.
 Rudolf Schäfer: Chronik von Höchst am Main. Frankfurt 1986: Waldemar Kramer.
 Adalbert Vollert: Sossenheim. Geschichte eines Frankfurter Stadtteils. Frankfurt  1980: Frankfurter Sparkasse von 1822.
 Johann Philipp Abelin: Theatrum Europaeum, Vol. 1, Frankfurt 1662, plate 1622, pages 630-633.

 Josef V. Polišenský/Frederick Snider: War and society in Europe (1618-1648). Bristol: Cambridge University Press, 1978. 

Battles of the Thirty Years' War
Battles involving the Holy Roman Empire
Battles involving Spain
Battles involving England
1622 in Europe
Conflicts in 1622
Capture
1622 in the Holy Roman Empire
Electoral Palatinate
Battles in Baden-Württemberg